A kamnan is a Thai governing official at the tambon (subdistrict) level. It is usually translated as "subdistrict headman".

The position of a kamnan was introduced with the Thesaphiban administrative reforms near the end of the 19th century, first enacted in 1892. The kamnan would to be chosen from the among village elders (phu yai ban) of the villages that make up the tambon. Originally, it was a lifetime post, but now is for a fixed term. The kamnan's main task was to implement the policies of the higher administrative levels, and he was the main point of government contact for the people of the tambon.

With the Tambon Council and Tambon Administrative Authority Act BE 2537 (1994), the tambon assumed a role in local policy making. Under the 1997 constitution, Tambon Administrative Organizations (TAO) were created as new local administrative units. The lifetime appointment also was replaced by a five-year term of office.

See also
 Somchai Khunpluem ("Kamnan Poh")

Sources

References

Tambon
Government of Thailand